Pheidole vistana is a species of ant and a higher myrmicine in the family Formicidae.

References

Further reading

 

vistana
Articles created by Qbugbot
Insects described in 1914